Alexander Högnason (born 7 August 1968) is an Icelandic former footballer who played as a defender. He won three caps for the Iceland national football team between 1990 and 1996 and scored once.

References
 

1968 births
Living people
Alexander Hognason
Alexander Hognason
Association football defenders
Alexander Hognason
Alexander Hognason